In chemistry, trihalomethanes (THMs) are chemical compounds in which three of the four hydrogen atoms of methane are replaced by halogen atoms.  Many trihalomethanes find uses in industry as solvents or refrigerants.  THMs are also environmental pollutants, and many are considered carcinogenic. Trihalomethanes with all the same halogen atoms are called haloforms.

Table of common trihalomethanes

Industrial uses
Only chloroform has significant applications of the haloforms.  In the predominant application, chloroform is required for the production of tetrafluoroethylene (TFE), precursor to teflon. Chloroform is fluorinated by reaction with hydrogen fluoride to produce chlorodifluoromethane (R-22). Pyrolysis of chlorodifluoromethane (at 550-750 °C) yields TFE, with difluorocarbene as an intermediate.
CHCl3 + 2 HF -> CHClF2 + 2 HCl
2 CHClF2 -> C2F4 + 2 HCl

Refrigerants and solvents 
Trifluoromethane and chlorodifluoromethane are both used as refrigerants.  Trihalomethanes released to the environment break down faster than chlorofluorocarbons (CFCs), thereby doing much less damage to the ozone layer.  Chlorodifluoromethane is a refrigerant HCFC, or hydrochlorofluorocarbon, while fluoroform is an HFC, or hydrofluorocarbon. Fluoroform is not ozone depleting.

Chloroform is a common solvent in organic chemistry.

Occurrence and production
The total global flux of chloroform through the environment is approximately  tonnes per year, and about 90% of emissions are natural in origin. Many kinds of seaweed produce chloroform, and fungi are believed to produce chloroform in soil.

Most of the specifically, chloroform, bromoform, and iodoform are easy to prepare through the haloform reaction, although this method does not lend itself to bulk syntheses. Note that fluoroform cannot be prepared in this manner.

Chloroform is produced by heating mixtures of methane or methyl chloride with chlorine. Dichloromethane is a coproduct.

Regulation
Trihalomethanes were the subject of the first drinking water regulations issued after passage of the U.S. Safe Drinking Water Act in 1974.

The EPA limits the total concentration of the four chief constituents  (chloroform, bromoform, bromodichloromethane, and dibromochloromethane), referred to as total trihalomethanes (TTHM), to 80 parts per billion in treated water.

Traces of chloroform are produced in swimming pools.

References

External links
 National Pollutant Inventory - Chloroform and trichloromethane
 How Ozone Technology Reduces Disinfection Byproducts
 Testing for Trihalomethanes
 EPA - Trihalomethanes in Drinking Water: Sampling, Analysis, Monitoring and Compliance (August 1983)

Halomethanes
Halogenated solvents
Refrigerants